Clematomyces is a genus of fungi in the family Laboulbeniaceae. The genus contain 4 or 5 species.

References

External links
Clematomyces at Index Fungorum

Laboulbeniaceae
Laboulbeniales genera